Wellington Eduardo Sánchez Luzuriaga (born June 19, 1974 in Ambato) is a former Ecuadorian football midfielder who last played for C.D. Olmedo.

He played for a few clubs, including Nacional Quito, MetroStars (USA), Los Angeles Galaxy (USA),  CS Emelec and Aucas.

He played for the Ecuador national football team and was a participant at the 2002 FIFA World Cup.

Titles
El Nacional
Serie A: 1996, 2006
Emelec
Serie A: 2001, 2002
Aucas
Segunda Categoria: 2012

External links
FEF's player card 
RSSSF

1974 births
Living people
People from Ambato, Ecuador
Association football midfielders
Ecuadorian expatriate sportspeople in the United States
Ecuadorian footballers
Ecuador international footballers
2002 FIFA World Cup players
1997 Copa América players
1999 Copa América players
2001 Copa América players
C.D. Técnico Universitario footballers
C.D. Universidad Católica del Ecuador footballers
C.D. El Nacional footballers
Ecuadorian expatriate footballers
Expatriate soccer players in the United States
Major League Soccer players
New York Red Bulls players
LA Galaxy players
C.S. Emelec footballers
C.S.D. Independiente del Valle footballers
S.D. Aucas footballers
Mushuc Runa S.C. footballers